Timothy Bevan (1704–1786) was a British apothecary and pharmacist.

Early life
Timothy Bevan was born in 1704. He was the son of Silvanus Bevan (1661–1727). He was the younger brother of Silvanus Bevan FRS (1691–1765).

Career
Bevan was an apothecary and pharmacist. With his brother, he had a shop at the Plough Court on Lombard Street, London.

Personal life
He married Elizabeth Barclay (1714–1745). Their son Silvanus Bevan (1743–1830) was a British banker. Their son Joseph Gurney Bevan (1753–1814) was a writer of Quaker apologetical works.

During the mid-18th century, he hired the English educator and Quaker Robert Proud to tutor his children. Proud would later go on to write a history of the Province of Pennsylvania (also known as the Pennsylvania Colony).

Death
He died in 1786.

References

1704 births
1786 deaths
Merchants from London
English people of Welsh descent
Barclays people
Timothy
English apothecaries
English pharmacists
English Quakers